Gus Wenner is an American magazine executive who is the Chief Executive Officer of Rolling Stone.

Early life and education

Wenner was born Edward Augustus Wenner  and is the son of Jane Schindelheim and magazine magnate Jann Wenner, founder of Rolling Stone and co-founder of the Rock and Roll Hall of Fame. Wenner graduated from Brown University in 2012. While in college, he was one part of the duo "Gus+Scout," alongside Scout LaRue Willis, daughter of Demi Moore and Bruce Willis.

Career

Wenner joined Wenner Media shortly after his graduation from Brown University in 2012. He was in charge of digital aspects of RollingStone.com with site traffic climbing 40 percent during his tenure. In 2013, at the age of 23, Wenner became the head of digital for the online versions of Wenner Media's Rolling Stone, Us Weekly, and Men's Journal magazines. During his time as head of digital, he was credited with launching Rolling Stone's standalone country website and also oversaw the sale of the publication to Penske Media Corporation.

Wenner stayed on as the president and chief operating officer of Rolling Stone after its sale to Penske Media Corporation in 2017. He is also the executive producer for several documentaries including  SuperVillain The Making Of Takashi 6ix9ine. In 2021 he was promoted to chief executive officer at Rolling Stone.

Filmography

References

External links 
 

Living people
American publishing chief executives
Rolling Stone people
Year of birth missing (living people)